Dwaram Venkataswamy Naidu (8 November 1893 – 25 November 1964) was one of the most important carnatic music violinists of the 20th century. Naidu was partially blind. He played at the National Physical Laboratory auditorium, New Delhi in 1952, to raise funds for the Blind Relief Association and he is the relative of famous kuchipudi dancer Padma sri Dr Shoba Naidu.

Early life
Dwaram Venkataswamy Naidu was born on 8 November 1893, which happened to be Deepavali day, in Bangalore, India and was raised in Visakhapatnam. His grandfather and father were both military men who played the violin as a hobby. He was appointed Professor of violin in the Maharaja's Music College in Vijayanagaram, at the young age of 26, and became its principal in 1936.

Performing career

His first solo concert was given in Vellore in 1938. He was known for his extremely well developed soft bowing technique combined with a firm fingering technique. He wrote several articles on music, like an essay on the "Peculiar characteristics of the tambura". He cautioned his disciples against missing practice even for a day. “If you don’t practice for one day, you will notice your mistakes, if you don’t practice for two days the audience would notice your mistakes!!”. He often used to say, "Music is an audible tapas."

The four most prominent Carnatic violin players in the first half of 20-th C were : Dwaram Venkataswamy Naidu, Kumbakonam Rajamanickam Pillai, T. Chowdiah, and Papa Venkataramaiah. All of them were awarded the prestigious Sangeetha Kalanidhi title.

Yehudi Menuhin, a world-renowned violinist, was greatly impressed when he heard Dwaram play at Justice P. V. Rajamannar's house. The famous playback singer Ghantasala learned Carnatic music under Naidu. Kalaimamani SMT.Radhanarayanan is also a disciple of V.naidu. Shri Venkateshwaran, vocalist is a student of Radhanarayanan.

Awards and honours

 Madras Music Academy presented him with Sangeetha Kalanidhi in 1941.
 The Indian Fine Arts Society bestowed on him the Sangeetha Kalasikhamani award in 1941.
 Andhra University conferred on him Kala Prapoorna in 1950.
 He received Sangeet Natak Academi Award in Fine Arts in 1953.
 Padma Shree Award was conferred on him in 1957.
 Indian Postal Department has released a commemorative stamp on his birth centenary in 1993.
 Raja-Lakshmi Award for the year 1992 by Sri Raja-Lakshmi Foundation, Chennai was awarded to Dwaram Venkataswamy Naidu Memorial Trust.

The Sri Dwaram Venkataswamy Naidu Memorial Trust was established in Chennai. Dwaram Venkataswamy Naidu Kalakshetram was established in Visakhapatnam.

Statues of this notable musician have been erected in Visakhapatnam and Chennai, India.

Personal life

Family
 DVN's daughter Dwaram Mangatayaru was a violin player, and her violin duets with her father are available on the net. 
 Eminent Musicologist Dwaram Bhavanarayana rao is his son. Prof. Dwaram Lakshmi, Dwaram Venkata Sarada Padmasree, Dwaram Anantha Venkata Swamy, Dr. Dwaram Venkata Krishna Ganesha Tyagaraj, Dwaram Srinivasa Pavan kumar  are the children of Dwaram Bhavanarayana Rao and Dwaram Venkata Varadamma.
 Dwaram Anantha Venkata Swamy is his grandson. He is a Civil Engineer working in Visakhapatnam Steel Plant.
 Dwaram lakshmi is daughter of Dwaram Bhavanarayana Rao. She is Vocalist presently working as professor in Padmavathi Mahila University.
  Justice Meenakumari, is grand daughter of Dwaram Venkataswamy Naidu and presently working as Chief Justice of Meghalaya High Court .
   is his grandson who is also a violinist

References

External links

 Performance of "Thanam-Kalyani” by Dwaram Venkataswami Naidu
 Dwaram Venkataswamy Naidu Indian postage stamp, issued 8-11-1993
 Dwaram Venkataswamy Naidu at Musicindiaonline.co
 
 Footprints in the sands of time – The Hindu

Telugu people
Carnatic violinists
Recipients of the Padma Shri in arts
1964 deaths
1893 births
Blind musicians
20th-century violinists
20th-century Indian musicians
Indian blind people
People from Uttarandhra
Sangeetha Kalanidhi recipients
Recipients of the Sangeet Natak Akademi Award
Blind academics